Émilien Jacquelin (born 11 July 1995) is a French biathlete. He competed in the 2018 Winter Olympics and the 2022 Winter Olympics.

Biathlon results
All results are sourced from the International Biathlon Union.

Olympic Games
2 medals (2 silver)

World Championships
8 medals (4 gold, 4 bronze)

*The single mixed relay was added as an event in 2019.

World Cup
World Cup rankings

Individual victories
3 victories

Relay victories
7 victories

*Results are from IBU races which include the Biathlon World Cup, Biathlon World Championships and the Winter Olympic Games.

References

External links

1995 births
Living people
French male biathletes
Sportspeople from Grenoble
Université Savoie-Mont Blanc alumni
Biathlon World Championships medalists
Biathletes at the 2018 Winter Olympics
Biathletes at the 2022 Winter Olympics
Medalists at the 2022 Winter Olympics
Olympic biathletes of France
Olympic silver medalists for France
Olympic medalists in biathlon